The Burgumer Mar is a lake near the town of Burgum in the Dutch province of Friesland. The lake was formed during the last ice age. It is a popular water sports area with multiple yacht harbours. The  splits the lake into a northern and southern part.

Since March 15, 2007, the West Frisian name Burgumer Mar is the official name; before that date the Dutch name was the official one). The villages Jistrum, Eastermar and Sumar together with Burgum border the lake.

References

External link

Lakes of the Netherlands
Tytsjerksteradiel
Landforms of Friesland